Ascot Place is an 18th-century mansion on the edge of Windsor Great Park, set in  of parkland between Cranbourne, North Ascot and Winkfield in the English county of Berkshire.

It is located close to Windsor Great Park and Ascot Racecourse. The mansion itself and various statues and other structures in its garden are Grade II listed, whilst a grotto to the south of house and at west end of lake is Grade I listed.

Records of Ascot Place date back to 1339, with owners including baked beans tycoon H.J. "Jack" Heinz II. In 1989 Khalifa bin Zayed bin Sultan Al Nahyan, the emir of Abu Dhabi, and one of the richest heads of state in the world worth hundreds of billions bought the mansion for a then record sum of £18million. It has remained with the Sheikh ever since.

References

Grade I listed buildings in Berkshire
Grade II listed buildings in Berkshire
Country houses in Berkshire
Grade II listed houses
Winkfield